Sisurcana leprana is a species of moth of the family Tortricidae. It is found in Colombia and Peru.

References

Moths described in 1875
Sisurcana